Thomas Bell Turner (June 22, 1915 – June 17, 2013), nicknamed "High Pockets",  was an American Negro league baseball player.

Playing career
A pitcher and first baseman, Turner played for the Cincinnati Stars in 1936. While in the military during the early 1940s, Turner played for the Service Command Unit baseball team. After returning to civilian life, Turner played briefly in Mexico. Returning stateside, he played for the Chicago American Giants in 1947 and later the Valley Tigers.

Personal life
Turner was born in Olive Branch, Tennessee. He attended Glendale High School and later the Tuskegee Institute. In 1940, he was drafted in the Army, though he did not serve overseas during World War II. and died at the age of 97 in Georgetown, Ohio.

References

External links
 and Seamheads

1915 births
2013 deaths
Baseball players from Tennessee
Chicago American Giants players
United States Army personnel of World War II
African Americans in World War II
African-American United States Army personnel